Michael Steck may refer to:

 Michael Steck (Indian agent) (1818–1880), physician and Indian agent in New Mexico Territory
 Michael Steck, also known as Pandora Boxx, American drag queen